Mioko is a populated island in the Duke of York Islands archipelago in Papua New Guinea.

Geography  

References

Islands of Papua New Guinea
Islands Region (Papua New Guinea)